Cychropsis cyanicollis is a species of ground beetle in the subfamily of Carabinae. It was described by Haeckel in 2003.

References

cyanicollis
Beetles described in 2003